Gunrock is the official mascot of the UC Davis Aggies. He is named after Gun Rock, who was born in 1914 and was the offspring of English Triple Crown winner Rock Sand and race mare Gunfire.  His bloodlines are similar to those of racehorse Man O' War. In 1921, he was brought by the U.S. Army Cavalry to the campus of University of California, Davis, which was breeding horses for the Cavalry at the time.  In 1924, he was adopted as the official mascot of the men's basketball team and accompanied the team to games and rallies.  Later, a traditional mascot was created and named Gunrock by the students.  That mascot persisted into the 1970s, when he was replaced by Ollie the Mustang.  Ollie did not last long, as a period of confusion about the school's mascot and nickname set in, lasting into the first decade of the 21st century. In 2003, after the school's official mascot was officially identified as the mustang, the name Gunrock returned.

https://www.ucdavis.edu/news/whats-gunrock-name-100-years-history==References==

Horse mascots
UC Davis Aggies